Caspers is a German language surname that stems from the male given name Casper. Notable people with the name include:

Barbara Caspers (active 1980), Australian paralympic shooter
Dirk Caspers (born 1980), German former footballer
Johannes Caspers (1910–1986), German politician
Lutz Caspers (born 1943), German athlete
Marion Caspers-Merk (1955), German politician

References 

German-language surnames
Surnames from given names